The rivalry between AEK and Panathinaikos (or the Athenian Derby) is the football local derby in Athens, the capital of Greece between AEK Athens and Panathinaikos.

History
Of the many transferred players between the two clubs only one has scored in the matches between them for both teams Nikos Liberopoulos.

The players with the most goals in the derby are Mimis Papaioannou, for AEK, with 7 goals and Antonis Antoniadis, for Panathinaikos, with 5 goals.

Statistics

Head-to-head

Matches list

Super League Greece

1 Game abandoned in the 70th minute.

2 Panathinaikos was awarded a 0–2 w.o. The original result was a 1–2 win for Panathinaikos.

Play-off match

1 Neutral field

2 The game was played at Nikos Goumas Stadium after a common agreement by both clubs. After the final result (a 3–3 draw), since there were no extra time or penalty shootout regulations, AEK Athens won the championship due to better overall goal difference during the season.

Greek Cup

1 The original match was played on 26 April 1959 at Nikos Goumas Stadium. It was interrupted in the 54th minute, while there was no score (0–0).
• Series won: AEK 11, Panathinaikos 7.

Greek Super Cup

Head-to-head ranking in Super League Greece

• Total: AEK Athens 25 times higher, Panathinaikos 38 times higher.

Men in both teams

References

External links
 in Greek
 in Greek
 in Greek
 in Greek
 in Greek
The Rec.Sport.Soccer Statistics Foundation

AEK Athens F.C.
Greece football derbies
Panathinaikos F.C.